Michael Feldman (born December 29, 1927 is a former politician in Toronto, Ontario. He was a municipal councillor from 1992 to 2010, and served as Deputy Mayor from 2003 to 2006.

Background
Before entering municipal politics, Feldman was a businessman who founded Teela Data Management, a company specializing in real estate information, which was sold to Moore Corporation Ltd. in 1982. He retired from business in 1988.

Feldman has served as president of the Beth Emeth Bais Yehuda Synagogue and of the Ontario Region of the United Synagogue of America, the central organization of synagogues in Conservative Judaism. He was active with the Canadian Council of Christians and Jews.

He and his wife, Sue, have three children.

Politics
Feldman was elected in 1992 in a by-election to North York council to replace longtime councillor Irv Chapley who had died in office early in the year. In addition to his job as a municipal councillor, he served as chair of the Metro Housing Development Corporation, a public housing agency serving the second-tier municipality of Metropolitan Toronto. In 1997 he was elected to the newly amalgamated Toronto City Council.

Feldman was a longtime supporter of Mel Lastman, the generally conservative mayor first of North York, then of the merged Toronto until 2003. In that year's municipal election, Feldman supported John Tory, a moderate conservative, for mayor. When David Miller, a social democrat, was elected, one of his first appointments was to name Feldman one of his three Deputy Mayors, jointly with Joe Pantalone and Sandra Bussin.

Along with the appointment of fellow councillor David Soknacki as budget chief, Feldman's appointment was seen as a key outreach to conservatives on the new mayor's part. The left-wing alternative weekly newspaper Now magazine wrote that "Miller has long respected Feldman's financial acumen and his commitment to neighbourhood issues. The retired business executive is a straight-shooting conservative who can get along with both sides at council and give North York a high-profile voice at City Hall."

After the 2006 election, Miller appointed a single deputy mayor, Pantalone. In 2009, Feldman joined the Responsible Government Group, a conservative caucus seen as an unofficial opposition to Miller and the centre-left majority of council.

Election results

References

1920s births
Businesspeople from Toronto
Jewish Canadian politicians
Living people
Toronto city councillors